Nicholas Austin Pizzolatto (born October 18, 1975) is an American writer, producer and director. He is best known for creating the HBO crime drama series True Detective.

Early life 
Pizzolatto was born in New Orleans, Louisiana. He is of Italian descent.  Pizzolatto grew up poor in a working-class Catholic family in New Orleans. At age five, he and his family moved to a rural area of Lake Charles, Louisiana.

Pizzolato graduated from Lake Charles' St. Louis Catholic High School in 1993 and left home when he was 17. Pizzolato attended Louisiana State University on a visual arts scholarship. He graduated from LSU with a B.A. in English and philosophy. Pizzolatto gave up writing following the death of a writing mentor and moved to Austin, Texas, where he worked as a bartender and technical writer for four years. He later enrolled in an MFA program in Creative Writing at the University of Arkansas, and received the Lily Peter Fellowship for poetry and Walton fellowship in 2003. He graduated in 2005.

Career

Fiction writing

Short stories 
He wrote two short stories when he was completing his MFA at the University of Arkansas – "Ghost-Birds" and
"Between Here and the Yellow Sea" – which were sold to The Atlantic Monthly. In 2004, his work was among the finalists for the National Magazine Award in Fiction. His collection of short fiction Between Here and the Yellow Sea was long-listed for the 2006 Frank O'Connor International Short Story Award and was also named one of the top five fiction debuts of the year by Poets & Writers Magazine.

He also received an honorable mention from the Pushcart Prize, and his short story "Wanted Man" is included in Best American Mystery Stories 2009.

Novels 
His first novel, Galveston, was published by Scribner's in June 2010. It was translated into many languages. In 2005, Pizzolatto was named one of Poets & Writers magazine's best new writers. In 2010, Galveston earned him the Prix du Premier Roman Étranger, the French Academy's award for Best First Novel, Foreign. It was also a 2010 Edgar Award finalist for best first novel. Galveston also won third prize in the 2010 Barnes and Noble Discovery Award, and additionally won the 2011 Spur Award for Best First Novel from the Western Writers of America. A film adaptation of the novel was released in 2018, based partially on a screenplay by Pizzolatto himself (credited under the pseudonym Jim Hammett) and starring Ben Foster and Elle Fanning.

Teaching 
Before creating True Detective, Pizzolatto taught fiction and literature as Kenan Visiting Writer (2005–2006) at University of North Carolina at Chapel Hill, in Spring 2008 at the University of Chicago, and as Assistant Professor of English (2008–12) at DePauw University. He moved to California to pursue a screenwriting career in the fall of 2010.

Television writing 
In 2011, he wrote two episodes for the first season of the crime drama television series The Killing. Pizzolatto was dissatisfied by the dynamic between the showrunner and the writers of the show; he remarked that, "I want to be the guiding vision. I don't do well serving someone else's vision." He decided to leave the show after spending two weeks in the writers room on the show's second season.

In 2012, he created an original television series called True Detective, which was sold to HBO and completed shooting in June 2013, with Pizzolatto as executive producer, sole writer, and showrunner. It premiered in January 2014, and became the most watched freshman show in the network's history. The show was critically acclaimed and was so popular the finale crashed HBO's HBO Go streaming service. Pizzolatto listed several influences on the show's first season: philosophy books such as Thomas Ligotti's The Conspiracy Against the Human Race, Eugene Thacker's In The Dust of This Planet, Ray Brassier's Nihil Unbound, Jim Crawford's Confessions of an Antinatalist, and David Benatar's Better Never to Have Been. Pizzolatto also mentions horror authors Laird Barron, John Langan, Simon Strantzas, and Ligotti.

A new season of True Detective premiered on June 21, 2015, with Pizzolatto again writing/co-writing all the episodes.

In late 2015, it was announced that Pizzolatto had signed a new deal with HBO through 2018.

In August 2016, HBO announced a potential new series written by Pizzolatto and starring Robert Downey Jr., centering on the character of investigative attorney Perry Mason. On August 25, 2017, it was announced that Pizzolatto had dropped out of the production in order to focus on the third season of True Detective and that he was being replaced as the project's writer by Rolin Jones and Ron Fitzgerald.

In January 2020, FX announced that Pizzolatto had signed an overall deal with the network, with the first project being the drama series Redeemer. The following year, negotiations for an early termination of the deal were underway after the development of Redeemer was canceled.

Screenwriting 
Along with Richard Wenk, Pizzolatto co-wrote the screenplay for The Magnificent Seven (2016), a remake of the period-piece western The Magnificent Seven (1960) (which was itself a western remake of Akira Kurosawa's 1954 film Seven Samurai). Antoine Fuqua directed, and the film, released on September 23, 2016, starred Denzel Washington, Chris Pratt, Vincent D'Onofrio, Lee Byung-hun, Ethan Hawke, Peter Sarsgaard and others.

Pizzolatto adapted his 2010 novel Galveston for the film of the same name; however, he requested to be credited under the pseudonym Jim Hammett following director Mélanie Laurent's contributions to the screenplay, despite not being formally engaged as a writer on the project, feeling the final script did not reflect his own. Producer Tyler Davidson confirmed the news to Entertainment Weekly, saying, "My personal opinion is that Nic did not feel the final script reflected his work as the sole credited writer, and his representatives advised us to credit him with his pseudonym."

In December 2018, Pizzolatto revealed that he had assisted Deadwood creator David Milch in writing the screenplay for the film adaptation. In return, Milch helped him with the third season of True Detective by co-writing the fourth episode as well as giving Pizzolatto advice on crafting the season.

In April 2019, it was announced that Pizzolatto had written the screenplay for the film Ghost Army for Universal Pictures. The film is to be headlined and directed by Ben Affleck.

In April 2020, Pizzolatto said he was interested in writing a Batman film, saying: "Batman is the only character in the world I didn't create that I want a shot at. And he's the only piece of geek culture I have any affinity for."

Awards 
The first two short stories Pizzolatto submitted sold simultaneously to The Atlantic. His collection of short fiction Between Here and the Yellow Sea was long-listed for the 2006 Frank O'Connor International Short Story Award and named one of the top five fiction debuts of the year by Poets & Writers Magazine.

Pizzolatto was a finalist for the National Magazine Award for Fiction in 2004. He received an honorable mention from the Pushcart Prize, and his story "Wanted Man" is included in Best American Mystery Stories 2009. While he was a graduate student at the University of Arkansas Programs in Creative Writing, Nic earned a number of awards in both fiction and poetry including a Lily Peter Fellowship in Poetry and a Walton Fellowship in Fiction.

His novel Galveston won third prize in the 2010 Barnes and Noble Discovery Award, and was a finalist for the 2010 Edgar Award for best first novel. It won the 2011 Spur Award for Best First Novel from the Western Writers of America. In France, Galveston was awarded the Prix du Premier Roman étranger (Best Foreign First Novel) for 2011, by a jury of literary critics. In 2015 it won Best Translated Crime Novel by the Swedish Crime Writers Academy.  In the Netherlands Galveston won the 2016 De VN Thriller Award.

For the 66th Primetime Emmy Awards, Pizzolatto was nominated for Outstanding Writing for a Drama Series for "The Secret Fate of All Life".

For the 67th Writers Guild of America Awards, Pizzolatto and the series won for Best Drama Series and Best New Series.

In 2015, Pizzolatto was nominated for a Producers Guild of America Award for Outstanding Producer of Episodic Television, Drama for True Detective.

In 2015, Pizzolatto was named British GQ Writer of the Year.

Pizzolatto and True Detective won the 2015 British Academy Television Award for Best International Programme.

Personal life 
Pizzolatto lives in Austin, TX with his daughter Allegra Pizzolatto. He got engaged to singer-songwriter Suzanne Santo in December 2021.

Filmography

Films

Television series

Writer

Publications 
 Pizzolatto, Nic. 2003. "Ghost-Birds" The Atlantic Monthly October 2003 issue. (short story).
 Pizzolatto, Nic. 2004. "Between Here and The Yellow Sea" The Atlantic Monthly November 2004 issue. (short story).
 Pizzolatto, Nic. 2004. "1987, The Races". The Missouri Review. 27, no. 1: 83-93. (short story)
 Pizzolatto, Nic. 2005. "Haunted Earth". The Iowa Review. 35, no. 2: 14-24. (short story)
 Pizzolatto, Nic. Between Here and the Yellow Sea: Stories. San Francisco, CA: MacAdam/Cage, 2005.  (a collection of 9 short stories)
 Pizzolatto, Nic. 2009. "Graves of Light". Ploughshares. 35, no. 4: 140-156. (short story)
 Pizzolatto, Nic. Galveston: A Novel. New York: Scribner, 2010.

Notes and references

External links 
  
 
 Master class with Mr. True Detective (translation) (Original, in Danish)

1975 births
21st-century American novelists
American crime fiction writers
American male novelists
American male screenwriters
American male short story writers
American short story writers
American television producers
American television writers
American writers of Italian descent
DePauw University faculty
Living people
Louisiana State University alumni
American male television writers
Showrunners
True Detective
University of Arkansas alumni
University of Chicago faculty
University of North Carolina at Chapel Hill faculty
Writers from New Orleans
Writers Guild of America Award winners
Novelists from Illinois
Novelists from Indiana
Novelists from Louisiana
21st-century American screenwriters
21st-century American male writers